Taça de Honra (Honour Cup) is a Portuguese friendly football tournament played between teams of the Lisbon Football Association (AFL). It is the third oldest competition in Portugal after the championships of Lisbon and Porto. The format has varied, and before the 1959–60 season, the trophy was mostly given to the winner of the Lisbon championship. Afterwards, it was played as a four-team elimination tournament during pre-season, between the best-placed Lisbon teams in championships disputed in the previous season. After 20 years of inactivity, the competition returned for two years: 2014 and 2015.

History 
During the 1920–21 and 1946–47 seasons, the Lisbon Football Association indexed the conquest of the Lisbon regional championship to the conquest of the Honour Cup. It was decided a club that had won the regional championship would receive an Honour Cup, even if the Cup had not been played. In 1920–21, Casa Pia got a place in the winners list (even though they did not compete) because they won the regional championship. In 1921–22, S.L. Benfica won the cup, but it was Sporting CP that got a place in the winners list by winning the regional championship.

Winners 
A list of all the Honour Cup finals is shown below with the final results, without the indexation of the regional championship.

References:

Performance by club 

Source:

References

External links
AFL Honour Cup

Sport in Lisbon